The salo or saw lo (Thai: สะล้อ) is a Thai spiked-fiddle with three strings (strung on 2-pegs), native to Lan Na in the north.

Strung today with 3 wires for strings, but formerly had silk strings.

See also
Traditional Thai musical instruments
Music of Thailand

References

External links
Sound sample

Drumhead lutes
Thai musical instruments
Bowed instruments